The Central Asian Women's Volleyball Championship is an international volleyball competition in Central and South Asia contested by the senior women's national teams of the members of Central Asian Zonal Volleyball Association (CAZVA), the sport's regional governing body. The current champion is Nepal, which won its first title at the 2019 tournament.

Results summary

Teams reaching the top four

Hosts

Medal summary

Participating nations

Debut of teams

Awards

Most Valuable Player

Best Spiker

Best Blocker

Best Setter

Best Libero

External links
 Official AVC website

V
International volleyball competitions
International women's volleyball competitions
Volleyball competitions in Asia